Thomas Berthold (born 12 November 1964) is a former German footballer and manager, who played as a defender. He currently works as a pundit and analyst for several TV stations.

Club career 
Berthold was born in Hanau, Hesse. His first club was TuSpV KeWa Wachenbuchen before he joined the youth ranks of SG Eintracht Frankfurt in 1978.

He played 332 games in the Bundesliga, scoring 22 goals. He began his career in 1982 with Eintracht Frankfurt and played for them until 1987. From 1987 until 1991 he played in Italy: for Hellas Verona (1987–1989) and A.S. Roma (1989–1991). He then returned to Germany, signing for FC Bayern Munich (1991–1993) and VfB Stuttgart (1993–2000). Berthold's last season as an active player was with the Turkish league club Adanaspor for whom he played until 15 January 2001.

International career 
Between 1985 and 1994 Berthold made 62 international appearances, scoring 1 goal, for the West German and German national teams, participating in the 1986 World Cup in Mexico and 1988 European Championships in West Germany. He was a member of the West German team which won the 1990 World Cup, but wasn't in the German team which took second place in the European Championships in Sweden in 1992. His last appearance in international competition came shortly after the 1994 World Cup.

Career statistics

Club

International

International goals
Score and results list West Germany's goal tally first.

Honours

Club
A.S. Roma 
 Coppa Italia: 1990–91
 UEFA Cup: Runner-up 1990–91

VfB Stuttgart
 DFB-Pokal: 1996–97
 DFB-Ligapokal: Runner-up 1997, 1998
 UEFA Cup Winners' Cup: Runner-up 1997–98

International
Germany
 FIFA World Cup: 1990; Runner-up 1986

Individual
 kicker Bundesliga Team of the Season: 1993–94

Media career
 On 10 June 2006, he appeared in BBC's sports quiz A Question of Sport – World Cup special preceding England's opening game in the finals.
 He is a frequent football pundit/analyst for German TV channels Sport1 and Liga total!.
 Berthold was the onfield anchorman for Eurosport's pan-European coverage of the UEFA Women's Euro 2013 commenting as well as interviewing players and coaches in English, German, Italian and Spanish.
 He appeared as a color commentator for n-tv's German language coverage of the 2013 Audi Cup.
 He appeared as a frequent pundit for British Eurosport's 2014 World Cup coverage.
 In August 2020, he spoke at a demonstration in Stuttgart, protesting against the anti-coronavirus measures introduced by the national government.

References

External links
 
 
 

1964 births
Living people
Sportspeople from Hanau
Association football central defenders
German expatriate footballers
German footballers
German football managers
Germany international footballers
Germany under-21 international footballers
FC Bayern Munich footballers
Eintracht Frankfurt players
VfB Stuttgart players
Hellas Verona F.C. players
A.S. Roma players
Adanaspor footballers
Bundesliga players
Serie A players
Süper Lig players
1986 FIFA World Cup players
UEFA Euro 1988 players
1990 FIFA World Cup players
1994 FIFA World Cup players
FIFA World Cup-winning players
Expatriate footballers in Turkey
Expatriate footballers in Italy
German expatriate sportspeople in Italy
Footballers from Hesse
West German footballers
West German expatriate footballers
West German expatriate sportspeople in Italy